Bridgette Ann Andrzejewski (born January 27, 1997) is an American former professional soccer player who last played as a forward for Houston Dash of the National Women's Soccer League (NWSL).

Club career
Andrzejewski made her professional debut for the Houston Dash on September 12, 2020. She retired from playing on April 23, 2021.

Honors
Houston Dash
 NWSL Challenge Cup: 2020

References

External links
 
 North Carolina profile

Living people
1997 births
American women's soccer players
National Women's Soccer League players
Houston Dash players
Women's association football forwards
North Carolina Tar Heels women's soccer players
Houston Dash draft picks